Lab Partners are an American shoegazing band from Dayton, Ohio.

History
Lab Partners first formed in Dayton in 1998 by Mike Smith, Amy Smith and Matt Schultz of the band Honeyburn and Kevin Parrett of Ten O'Clock Scholar. After releasing two EPs in 1999 and 2002, drummer Matt Schultz left the group to join Let's Crash, and later, Enon. He was replaced with Ian Kaplan, and the group released its first full-length, Daystar, in 2002 to critical acclaim. After Daystar'''s release, Mike Volk (another Honeyburn veteran) replaced Parrett on guitar and Todd Carll took over for Kaplan on drums. Appearances at SXSW and several tours around the US followed over the next several years, as well as another LP and EP. Moonlight Music was released in 2010 and featured Kevin Vaughn (Heartless Bastards) on drums.

Members
Current members
Mike Smith – vocals, guitar
Mike Volk – guitar
Amy Smith – keyboards, bass
Jim McPherson - drums (from the Breeders)

Former members
Matt Schulz – drums
Kevin Parrett – guitar
Ian Kaplan – drums
Todd Carll – drums
Kevin Vaughn – drums

Discography
Studio albumsDaystar (2002, Big Beef Records)Wicked Branches (2005, Reverb Records)Moonlight Music (2010, Pravda Records)Seven Seas (2014, Pravda Records)Mind Control (2020, Pravda Records)

EPsLab Partners EP (1999, Self-released)Turn It On EP (2000, Self-released)Keep Quiet'' EP (2007, Reverb Records)

References

External links
Official website
Full listing of press sources

American shoegaze musical groups
Musical groups from Dayton, Ohio